Gordon Murray is a South African car designer.

Gordon Murray may also refer to:
 Gordon Murray (politician) (1927–2015), Scottish nationalist politician
Gordon Murray (puppeteer) (1921–2016), British television producer and puppeteer
Donald Walter Gordon Murray (1894–1976), aka Gordon Murray, Canadian surgeon
Gordon Murray, Scottish architect, see Gordon Murray & Alan Dunlop Architects
Gordon S. Murray, co-author of The Investment Answer